David Davis (born 1961) is an American mandolinist and singer in the bluegrass tradition. He has been cited as a foremost practitioner of Bill Monroe's mandolin technique.

Biography

Early years
Davis was raised In Cullman, Alabama in a musical family. His grandfather J.H. Bailey played banjo and fiddle. In the 1930s, his father Leddell Davis and uncles sang the "brother duets" music style (a forerunner of bluegrass music), and Davis's uncle Cleo Davis was a member of the first incarnation of Bill Monroe's Blue Grass Boys.

Warrior River Boys
Garry Thurmond formed the original Warrior River Boys in 1960. When his health failed in 1984, he turned leadership of the band over to Davis. The band has included fiddler Charlie Cline and former Blue Grass Boy Tom Ewing.

The band recorded 150 songs with Wango Records, launched by radio personality Ray Davis. These "Basement Recordings" have appeared on various albums through the years, many on the Time Life label.

In 1990, Davis released the album New Beginnings followed in 1993 by Sounds Like Home, both on Rounder Records. Released in 2004, the album David Davis & The Warrior River Boys on Rebel Records features a wide range of rarely-covered songs. 2006 saw the release of Troubled Times.

In 2009, Davis released Two Dimes & A Nickel on Rebel. Besides Davis on mandolin, the current lineup of the Warrior River Boys includes Phillip James (fiddle), Stan Wilemon (guitar), Marty Hays (bass), and Robert Montgomery (banjo).

Awards
Davis was inducted into the Alabama Bluegrass Music Hall of Fame in 2010.

In 2014, Davis was inducted into America's Old-Time Country Music Hall Of Fame.

Discography

David Davis and the Warrior River Boys
 1988: "Passin' Thru" (Rutabaga)
 1990: New Beginnings (Rounder)
 1993: Sounds Like Home (Rounder)
 200?: America's Music (Wango)
 200?: My Dixie Home (Wango)
 2004: David Davis and the Warrior River Boys (Rebel)
 2006: Troubled Times (Rebel)
 2009: Two Dimes & A Nickel (Rebel)
 2018: Didn't He Ramble: Songs Of Charlie Poole (Rounder)

Compilations
 2016: Retrospective: Live 1984-2014 (self-released)

Also appears on
 2000: various artists - Freight Trains Rides Again Volume One (Wango)
 2000: various artists Plum Pitiful Volume Two (Wango)
 2001: various artists - ''It's Hymn-Time Volume Two's (Wango)

References

External links 
 
 
 

1961 births
American country singer-songwriters
Bluegrass musicians from Alabama
American mandolinists
American bluegrass mandolinists
Living people
People from Cullman, Alabama
Country musicians from Alabama
Singer-songwriters from Alabama